The Volunteer Firemen Monument is an outdoor memorial commemorating Texan volunteer firefighters who died while in service, installed on the Texas State Capitol grounds in Austin, Texas, United States. It was erected by the State Firemen's Association of Texas in 1896, and modified in 1905. The monument features a bronze sculpture of a fireman carrying a child in his left arm and a lantern in his opposite, designed by J. Segesman. The statue rests on a granite base designed by Frank Teich, which has a ring of granite pillars with inscribed names of volunteers. According to the Texas State Preservation Board, the memorial has "historical omissions and errors", which have been kept.

See also

 1896 in art

References

External links
 

1896 establishments in Texas
1896 sculptures
Bronze sculptures in Texas
Granite sculptures in Texas
Monuments and memorials in Texas
Outdoor sculptures in Austin, Texas
Sculptures of children in the United States
Sculptures of men in Texas
Statues in Texas